Sparks was an alcoholic beverage that debuted in the US market in 2002. The original formulation contained caffeine, one of the first alcoholic beverages to do so. Its other original active ingredients included taurine, ginseng and guarana, common to energy drinks.

Packaged in a can, its labeling indicates a 6% alcoholic content by volume. Its flavor was similar to other energy drinks such as Red Bull, Monster Energy, and Rockstar, with a tart, sugary taste. Sparks' final formulation did not contain caffeine or taurine. Original packaging was a 16 oz (475 mL) silver can with bright orange tops, with a "+" printed near the top and a "–" printed near the bottom, intended to be reminiscent of a battery. 

Other varieties included a sugar-free "Sparks Light" version with a bright blue top. Higher-alcohol versions, named "Sparks Plus" (black top, 7% alcohol), "Sparks Red" (red top, 8% alcohol), and "Sparks Stinger" (yellow top, 8% alcohol) are packaged in both 16oz and 24oz cans. Sparks rolled out an iced tea, lemonade and blackberry flavor in the early 2010s but quickly shrank their product line to only two flavors- original orange and blackberry. Those two flavors were available until August 2021 when current owners, Molson Coors, decided to discontinue the orange and blackberry flavors (the only two that existed at the time). A representative stopped short of saying the brand would be dissolved, but as it stands SPARKS has reached the end of their nearly two decade run.

History
Created in 2002 by San Francisco-based beverage marketing firm McKenzie River Corporation, early marketing relied on word of mouth primed by giving away large quantities of the beverage. Between 2003 and 2005, it had a 107% compound annual growth rate.

On July 3, 2006, Miller Brewing Company announced it had entered into an agreement to acquire Sparks from McKenzie River Corp. for $215 million, with acquisition completed on August 14, 2006. Miller had been producing Sparks prior to this purchase. It is currently producing it under the Steel Brewing Company label of Milwaukee, Wisconsin.

In September 2008, the Center for Science in the Public Interest, a Washington, D.C.-based non-profit watchdog and consumer advocacy group, sued MillerCoors, claiming that its Sparks alcoholic beverages that include caffeine are a health hazard. 

Three months later, at the behest of San Francisco and thirteen states, distributor MillerCoors LLC announced it would remove the caffeine from its Sparks line of energy drinks, and would change its marketing campaign. "We're doing it to protect the public health of our young people and to reform business practices," said S.F. City Attorney Dennis Herrera.

Nutritional information 
Energy:  350 Calories (1463 kilojoules)
from carbohydrates: 188 calories (787 kJ) (54%)
from alcohol: 161 calories (674 kJ) (46%)
Total carbohydrates 47 g 16%

Sparks Light (per 12 oz / 355 mL)
133 Calories
3.3 grams of carbohydrates
0.0 grams of fat.

See also
 Comparison of alcopops

References 

Energy drinks
Alcopops
Premixed alcoholic drinks
Food and drink introduced in 2002
American alcoholic drinks